Samuel Hubbel Treat Jr. (June 21, 1811 – March 27, 1887) was an American lawyer and jurist who served as a justice of the Illinois Supreme Court and a United States district judge of the United States District Court for the Southern District of Illinois.

Education and career

Born in Plainfield, New York, Treat read law to enter the bar in 1834. He was in private practice in Springfield, Illinois from 1834 to 1839. He was a Judge of the Circuit Court of Illinois from 1839 to 1841, becoming a justice of the Illinois Supreme Court in 1841. He served on that court until 1855, serving as chief justice from 1848.

Federal judicial service

On March 3, 1855, Treat was nominated by President Franklin Pierce to a new seat on the United States District Court for the Southern District of Illinois created by 10 Stat. 606. Treat was confirmed by the United States Senate on March 3, 1855, and received his commission the same day. He served until his death on March 27, 1887, in Springfield.

Court appearances by Abraham Lincoln

Abraham Lincoln often appeared in court before Judge Treat. The Illinois State Bar Association estimates that "Between 1839 and 1855, Judge Treat heard Lincoln argue 870 circuit court cases and about 162 Supreme Court matters. As a federal judge, he heard at least 136 more of Lincoln's cases."

References

Sources
 

1811 births
1887 deaths
Illinois state court judges
Judges of the United States District Court for the Southern District of Illinois
United States federal judges appointed by Franklin Pierce
19th-century American judges
Chief Justices of the Illinois Supreme Court
People from Plainfield, New York
People from Springfield, Illinois
United States federal judges admitted to the practice of law by reading law
Justices of the Illinois Supreme Court